The 1994–95 Liverpool F.C. season was the 103rd season in the club's existence, and their 33rd consecutive year in the top-flight. It was also the club's first full season under the management of Roy Evans, who had succeeded Graeme Souness halfway through 1993–94.

The season saw Liverpool win the League Cup for a record fifth time, beating Bolton Wanderers 2–1 in the final at Wembley with two goals from Steve McManaman. They improved on last season's eighth-place finish to reach fourth place in the final table, their best final position in four years, although they never really looked like serious title contenders.

Early in the season, Evans bolstered his defence by signing John Scales from Wimbledon and Phil Babb from Coventry City. In attack, Robbie Fowler was top scorer with 25 goals in the league and 31 in all competitions, while the ageing Ian Rush continued to thrive with 12 in the league and 19 in all competitions.

Heading out of the Anfield exit door early in the season was midfielder Don Hutchison to West Ham United, while January saw exit of defender Steve Nicol to Notts County after 13 years at Anfield. The club suffered a tragedy on 2 January 1995 when 19-year-old midfielder Ian Frodsham, who was on a professional contract but had yet to play a first team game, died of cancer of the spine.

Players

First-team squad

Left club during season

Reserves and academy

Transfers

In

Out

Premier League

League table

Matches

FA Cup

Matches

Coca-Cola Cup

Matches

Statistics

Goalscorers

Competition top scorers

Season overview

August
The only major signing of the season was that of Danish goalkeeper Michael Stensgaard as understudy to David James, following Bruce Grobbelaar's departure to Southampton. Defender Julian Dicks had returned to West Ham United after an unsuccessful season at Anfield, followed by midfielder Don Hutchison just after the start of the season, around the same time that veteran Ronnie Whelan called time on 15 years at Anfield and signed for Southend United.

The league campaign began in style with a 6–1 away win over newly promoted Crystal Palace in which Ian Rush and Steve McManaman both scored twice, with Robbie Fowler and Jan Molby scoring the other goals. Robbie Fowler then managed a hat-trick in less than five minutes in the next game, when Liverpool beat Arsenal 3–0 at Anfield. Fowler was on target again, along with John Barnes, in the next game – a 2–0 win at Southampton.

September
The month began with Roy Evans breaking the national defender transfer fee with a £3.6 million move for Wimbledon's John Scales, followed 24 hours later by a £3.5 million signing of Coventry's Phil Babb.

Liverpool saw league action just three times in September, and failed to record any wins. The first game was a goalless draw at home to West Ham, followed by a 2–0 defeat at Manchester United before Ian Rush scored Liverpool's only league goal of the month in a 1–1 away draw with Newcastle United. The Reds were sixth in the league, which was being led by Newcastle.

The League Cup quest began on 21 September, in which John Scales scored his first goal for the club and was joined on the scoresheet by Robbie Fowler in a 2-0 second-round first-leg win over Burnley at Turf Moor.

October
October saw mixed results for Liverpool, who were beaten 3-2 by Kenny Dalglish's title chasers Blackburn Rovers at Ewood Park before recording a 3–0 home win over Wimbledon and a 3–1 away win over Ipswich Town. The month ended on a sour note with a 2–1 defeat at QPR.

Liverpool eliminated Burnley from the League Cup with a 4–1 win in the second leg, in which Jamie Redknapp was on the scoresheet twice and Nigel Clough scored what would be his only goal of the season. In the next round, Ian Rush scored twice as the Reds defeated Stoke City 2–1 at Anfield.

The Reds ended October in fifth place, with Newcastle still leading the way, newly promoted Nottingham Forest second and pushing hard for a rare title one season after promotion, followed by Manchester United and Blackburn.

November
A goal from Robbie Fowler on 5 November gave Liverpool a 1–0 home win over fellow title challengers Nottingham Forest at Anfield. Fowler then scored twice in the next game, a 3–1 win home win over Chelsea. Liverpool were then on the losing side in the Merseyside derby at Goodison Park, where a struggling Everton won 2–0. The month ended with a 1–1 home draw against Tottenham Hotspur. The League Cup quest continued at the end of the month when an Ian Rush hat-trick disposed of Blackburn in the fourth round at Ewood Park. The Reds ended the month fourth in the Premier League, six points behind leaders Blackburn.

December
Liverpool were unbeaten in the six league games they played in December, but the first three of those were draws so the subsequent wins over Leicester City, Manchester City and Leeds United restricted them to third place in the league when wins from those first three games would have put them just one point behind leaders Blackburn.

January
The first month of 1995 saw the departure of Liverpool's longest serving player Steve Nicol, who signed for Division One strugglers Notts County after losing his place in the first team to new arrivals John Scales and Phil Babb.

However, the year began on a bright note with a 4–0 home win over Norwich City. Then came a 1–0 defeat at home to struggling Ipswich, followed by a goalless draw in the second Merseyside derby of the season at Anfield.

There was success in the cup competitions as an Ian Rush goal gave the Reds 1–0 win over Arsenal in the League Cup quarter-final. However, it took a penalty shoot-out in a replay to see off Division Two underdogs Birmingham City in the FA Cup third round, while Division One strugglers Burnley faced Liverpool again after the League Cup meeting to hold the Reds to a goalless draw at Turf Moor, forcing yet another replay against lower league opposition.

February
Another quiet month for league action saw the Reds held to 1-1 draws with Forest and QPR before scraping to a 2–1 win away to Sheffield Wednesday. As had happened last month, the biggest news for Liverpool was in the cup competitions. The FA Cup fourth round replay saw them overcome Burnley 1–0, before a fifth round clash with Wimbledon ended in a 1–1 draw and forced another replay, which the Reds won 2–0. Then came the League Cup semi-final first leg at Anfield, in which a Robbie Fowler goal saw the Reds defeat Crystal Palace (battling relegation but chasing glory in both cup competitions) 1–0.

It was looking too late for Liverpool to challenge for a league title win and a unique domestic treble, as they were now 15 points behind leaders Blackburn (though they did have two games in hnd) and occupying fourth place.

March
March brought the familiar pattern for Liverpool of mixed results in the league but good form in the cups. Wins over title hopefuls Manchester United and Newcastle but a home defeat by relegation-threatened Coventry and an away draw with Tottenham Hotspur saw them fall to fifth place in the table and leave their title hopes almost completely dead. The FA Cup fifth round replay against Wimbledon saw Liverpool win 2–0, but their hopes of glory ended in the quarter-finals when they 2–1 at home to Tottenham Hotspur. However, the League Cup campaign continued with another 1–0 win over Crystal Palace and another goal from Robbie Fowler in the second leg of the semi-final, to book the Reds a Wembley date with Bolton Wanderers and a chance of becoming the first team to win the League Cup five times.

April
The League Cup final at Wembley Stadium on 2 April 1995 saw Liverpool beat Bolton 2–1 with a brace from Steve McManaman giving Roy Evans the first major trophy of his managerial career, and Liverpool's first major trophy since the FA Cup in 1992. With a place in the UEFA Cup guaranteed for next season and the title now beyond reasonable hope for Liverpool, there was less pressure on them in the final few games of the season, and they looked well placed to finish higher in the league than they had in any of the previous three seasons. Four wins and two defeats from six games made the previously crucial top-five finish a near certainty anyway.

May
A draw with Wimbledon and defeats to two sides climbing clear of relegation danger (Aston Villa and West Ham United) were of little importance to a Liverpool side who could no longer win the title but had already booked European action with their League Cup glory. There was, however, one more game left to play. The final game of the league season was at Anfield on 14 May, and the opponents were Blackburn. Kenny Dalglish's new team were two points ahead of Manchester United – the last side capable of catching them – and a win for them would secure their first league title since 1914. However, if they lost or drew and Manchester United won at West Ham, the title would remain at Old Trafford for the third successive season. There was speculation that Liverpool would give their old manager an easy ride and let him add to the three title success he had managed them to in his time there, but Roy Evans dismissed such talk and his Liverpool side defeated Dalglish's men 2–1. The stadium was a scene of jubilation after the final whistle when news came through that the game in east London had ended in a 1–1 draw and Blackburn had ended their 81-year title wait.

Notes

References

Liverpool F.C. seasons
Liverpool